Benjamin Ortner (born March 16, 1983) is a former Austrian professional basketball player who last played for Pallacanestro Reggiana of the Italian Lega Basket Serie A (LBA).

Early Years and College Career
Ortner was born and raised in Innsbruck, Austria, where he attended primary and secondary school. Prior to his junior year of high school, he decided to study abroad for a year in the United States where he attended St. Joseph Notre Dame High School, a well-known basketball school based in Alameda (CA). 

Due to unfounded allegations made by other competing schools in the region, CIF forced Ortner to sit out the majority of the 1999-2000 season, eventually clearing him to play in the final four games of the year. That year, Ortner and St. Joseph's advanced to regional semi-finals where they lost to eventual champions and USA Today's #10 ranked team in the country, De La Salle of Concord.     

Ortner subsequently went on to play collegiately at Metropolitan State University of Denver, and for head coach Mike Dunlap, where he won a Division II National Championship in 2002.

Professional career
In September 2012, he signed a three-month contract with Gießen 46ers of the German Basketball Bundesliga. He left them after only 4 games and returned to Italy to sign with Montepaschi Siena. 

In July 2014, he signed a one-year deal with Umana Reyer Venezia.
One year later, both parties extended the contract through 2015-16.

In October 2017, Ortner signed a deal with Sidigas Avellino. On December 15, 2017, Ortner left Avellino and signed a deal with Germani Basket Brescia until the end of the season.

On November 13, 2018, Ortner officially signed a deal with Pallacanestro Reggiana.

References

External links
Euroleague profile
Lega Basket Serie A profile 

1983 births
Living people
Austrian men's basketball players
Basket Brescia Leonessa players
Centers (basketball)
Giessen 46ers players
Lega Basket Serie A players
Mens Sana Basket players
Metro State Roadrunners men's basketball players
Pallacanestro Cantù players
Pallacanestro Reggiana players
Pallacanestro Treviso players
Pallalcesto Amatori Udine players
Reyer Venezia players
S.S. Felice Scandone players
Sportspeople from Innsbruck